Maftei is a Romanian surname. Notable people with the surname include:

Alexandru Maftei, Romanian film director
Ernest Maftei (1920–2006), Romanian actor
Valentin Maftei (born 1974), Romanian rugby union footballer
Vasile Maftei (born 1981), Romanian footballer

Romanian-language surnames